The 1958 World Greco-Roman Wrestling Championship was held in Budapest, Hungary.

Medal table

Team ranking

Medal summary

Men's Greco-Roman

References
FILA Database

World Wrestling Championships
International wrestling competitions hosted by Hungary
World Wrestling Championships, 1958
1958 in sport wrestling